Mogwase Stadium is a football stadium in Mogwase, near Rustenburg in the North West Province, South Africa.

It was used by the United States national football team and the South African team as a training base during the 2009 FIFA Confederations Cup.

References

Moses Kotane Local Municipality
Soccer venues in South Africa
Sports venues in North West (South African province)